Perlich which is variant surname to Perlick, which is an Old High German surname, which means bero lih = ‘bear-like’. 

Perlich is not to be confused with the South Slavic surname Perlich.
 Meaning of Perlick

Surnames